Adam & Paul is a 2004 Irish buddy comedy drama film directed by Lenny Abrahamson and starring Tom Murphy and Mark O'Halloran. It follows a day in the life of two Dublin drug addicts, Adam and Paul, as they wander around Dublin trying to score heroin.

Plot
Adam and Paul are childhood friends from Dublin who as adults have become heroin addicts, tied together by habit and necessity. The film is a stylised, downbeat comedy, following the pair through a single day, which, like every other, is devoted to scrounging and robbing money to buy heroin.

Adam and Paul wake up sick in the middle of a field with Adam glued to a mattress. They make their way into town via a run-in with a belligerent drug dealer named Martin living in Ballymun, a hasty exit from the top deck of a bus, a long trudge down the median of a dual carriageway, and an incident with a moped that injures Paul's leg. Wandering through St Stephen's Green they meet a group of their old friends who are drinking alcohol and having "a little picnic for the kiddies". Unwelcome, the boys sit down despite a torrent of abuse from Marian and Orla who are furious with them for not turning up that morning to the month's mind of Matthew, the boys' best friend and Orla's brother. Marian, backed by her brother Wayne, warns them to stay away from his sister, Janine. To the disgust of Wayne and the girls, Georgie lets slip that there was to be a "do" on for Matthew that night in the Bunker pub.

From there the film follow the pair as they aimlessly wander around the city looking for an unknown person — perhaps a contact that might be able to sort them out with a fix. They have a misunderstanding with a homeless man in a sleeping bag who thinks they're looking for a local troublemaker under the alias of "Clank" who he mistakenly gathers owes them money. Paul hurts his hand in a botched attempt at a smash and grab; they get kicked out of a café for trying to steal a handbag, and Paul gets banned from a shop. After an argument with a Bulgarian immigrant, and failing to get anywhere in their search for drugs, they make their way to Janine's. She is not home but the door is left open. The boys are just about to steal her television, when they hear the sound of a baby crying. Janine returns home to find the two gently holding and whispering to the baby. They leave Janine with the promise that they will see her again that night at the Bunker.

The pair mug an adolescent with Down syndrome, but find he has neither cash nor valuables. Later, a furious man violently confronts them, accusing them of spreading rumours that he owes them money. He identifies himself as Clank. Clank and his friend Zippy kidnap the two and force them to keep a lookout for trouble while they "cause a bit of mayhem" in a nearby garage with baseball bats. Adam and Paul fail to notice the arrival of police, and both Clank and Zippy are arrested.

They decide to take Clank's car to a fence, but crash in the process. Sitting on an old cooker down a back lane, they come across a large television set. With the help of a fence named Kittser, they take the TV to Ballymun and attempt to sell it to an older man. But Kittser and the buyer argue and the TV gets damaged in the altercation, forcing a demoralised Adam and Paul to leave. On their way out, they pass the door of drug dealer Martin who is being attacked by a gang of vigilantes. As the two sit outside the block, the contents of Martin's flat are thrown off of his tower block and land on the ground around the boys including two bags of heroin.

After spending the night in the centre of Dublin intoxicated on their find, Paul wakes up the next morning on Dublin Bay. Adam, who is lying behind him, has overdosed and died. Paul, visibly distraught and conflicted, resigns to taking the two bags of heroin from Adam's pockets and leaving.

Cast
 Mark O'Halloran as Adam
 Tom Murphy as Paul
 Gerry Moore as Clank
 Anthony Morris as Zippy
 Ion Caramitru as Eastern-European Man
 Deirdre Molloy as Marian
 Mary Murray as Orla
 Paul Roe as Wayne
 David Herlihy as Kittser
 Eamonn Hunt as Gringo

Reception 
Adam & Paul received positive reviews from The Telegraph, The Times, and other UK publications.

Time Out gave the film 5/5, calling it "Mordantly funny and unexpectedly poignant".

Peter Bradshaw of The Guardian gave the film 3 out of 5 stars.

Leslie Felperin of the Radio Times gives the film 3 out of 5, calling it a "downbeat comedy or slapstick tragedy, depending on which way you look at it".

Total Film gives the film a score of 2 out of 5, describing the film as grim and saying only masochists need apply.

Critical analysis 
Many critics have pointed out the similarities between Adam & Paul and Samuel Beckett's Waiting for Godot. Barry Monahan suggests that this is particularly evident in their interactions with the Bulgarian man. He further contends that though exterior spaces are framed as an unheimlich "inversion of the homely", interior spaces are even more inhospitable, framing Adam and Paul as outcasts in their society.

Awards 
Adam & Paul won the Best Director Award, as well as being nominated in 8 categories at the 2nd Irish Film & Television Awards. These include Best Irish Film, Best Script, Best Actor and Best Music.

At the 2005 Berlin Film Festival, Adam & Paul played as part of the official program of the Panorama section.

References

Notes

Sources

External links 
 

2004 films
2000s buddy comedy-drama films
2000s English-language films
Films about drugs
Films about heroin addiction
Films directed by Lenny Abrahamson
Films set in Dublin (city)
Irish comedy-drama films
Films shot in Dublin (city)
2004 comedy films
2004 drama films
English-language Irish films